Gary "Spike" O'Sullivan (born 14 July 1984) is an Irish professional boxer. Between 2009 and 2017, he held multiple middleweight championships at regional level including the Irish title. 

He also acted and performed stunts in the 2007 film Strength and Honour.

Boxing career

O'Sullivan vs. Hall
O'Sullivan defeated Matthew Hall in a close contest, at Upton Park, London, on 14 July 2012 on the undercard of David Haye vs. Derek Chisora, to win the WBO intercontinental middleweight title.

O'Sullivan vs. Nunez
It was announced following this defeat of Larry Smith that O'Sullivan would take on former world contender Milton Nunez. O'Sullivan, before the fight, described the bout as "the most important fight of my life". He started the fight well with some solid body shots easily claiming the first round. He knocked Nunez down in the second round and ultimately scored an impressive victory, by TKO, over Nunez in the third round.

O'Sullivan vs. Douglas
After a loss to Chris Eubank Jr., O'Sullivan won four straight fights to earn a December 2017 bout against rising prospect Antoine Douglas on HBO. While the fight was meant to be a showcase for Douglas, O'Sullivan won a gritty battle by seventh-round knockout.

O'Sullivan vs. Lemieux
After beating Berlin Abreu on 4 May, it was announced that O'Sullivan would be fighting on the undercard of Canelo Álvarez vs. Gennady Golovkin II on 15 September. A fight with David Lemieux, a fight that Spike had previously chased in recent years, was mooted but O'Sullivan seemed reluctant to give Lemieux the fight as he had previously turned it down himself. However, after weeks of back and forth verbal jousting online, the fight was officially made with both fighters declaring that they will knock the other out and many tipping it as a potential fight of the night.

O’Sullivan was knocked out in the first round.

In his first comeback fight, O'Sullivan defeated Gabor Gorbics on points in his home country of Ireland.

In his next fight, O'Sullivan recorded his second win in a row, defeating overmatched opponent Khiary Gray in six rounds.

O'Sullivan vs Munguia 
On 11 January 2020, O'Sullivan fought former world champion Jaime Munguia, who was ranked #1 by the WBO and #3 by the WBC at middleweight. O'Sullivan put up a great fight, but in the end Munguia just had too much left in the tank, as he finished the Irishman in the eleventh round via TKO.

Professional boxing record

Filmography
Strength and Honour (2007, stunts)
The Last Round (2012, short film, as Opponent)
The Vein Within (2013, as Steven Murphy)

References

External links
 
 
 Interview with Middleweight Prospect Gary "Spike" O’Sullivan at Boxing Insider
 Boxer Spike O'Sullivan Celebrates Win, Gets Stool Thrown at Him at Bleacher Report
Gary O'Sullivan – Profile, News Archive & Current Rankings at Box.Live

Irish male boxers
1984 births
Sportspeople from Cork (city)
Living people
Middleweight boxers